Atâ-Malek Juvayni (1226–1283), in full, Ala al-Din Ata-ullah,  was a Persian historian and an official of the Mongol state who wrote an account of the Mongol Empire entitled Tarīkh-i Jahān-gushā (History of the World Conqueror).

Early life
Juvayni was born in Joveyn, a city in Khorasan in eastern Persia. Both his grandfather and his father, Baha al-Din, had held the post of sahib-divan or Minister of Finance for Muhammad Jalal al-Din and Ögedei Khan respectively. Baha al-Din also acted as deputy c. 1246 for his immediate superior, the emir Arghun, in which role he oversaw a large area including Kingdom of Georgia.

Career
Juvayni, just as his predecessors became an important state official. He visited the Mongol capital of Karakorum twice, beginning his history of the Mongols conquests on one such visit (c. 1252–53). He was with Ilkhan Hulagu in the 1256 campaign at the taking of Alamut, where he selected many 'choice books' from the famous Alamut library for his own purposes and burnt those books that he did not like.was responsible for saving part of its celebrated library. He had also accompanied Hulagu during the sack of Baghdad in 1258, and the next year was appointed governor of Baghdad, Lower Mesopotamia, and Khuzistan. Around 1282, Juvayni attended a Mongol quriltai, or assembly, held in the Ala-Taq pastures northeast of Lake Van. He died the following year in Mughan or Arran in Azerbaijan.

Siege of Alamut

Juvayni's brother was the powerful Shams al-Din Mohammad Sahib-Divan, who had served as Minister of Finance under Hulagu and Abaqa Khan. A skillful leader in his own right, Shams al-Din also had influential in-laws: his wife Khoshak was the daughter of Avag Mkhargrdzeli, Lord High Constable of Georgia, and Gvantsa, a noblewoman who went on to become queen of Georgia.

Work and legacy

Juvayni's position at court and his family connections made him privy to information unavailable to other historians. For unknown reasons, Juvayni's Tarīkh-i Jahān-gushā ends in 1260, more than twenty years before his death.

The standard edition of Juvayni's history is published under the title Tarīkh-i Jahān-gushā, ed. Mirza Muhammad Qazwini, 3 vol, Gibb Memorial Series 16 (Leiden and London, 1912–37). An English translation by John Andrew Boyle The History of the World-Conqueror was republished in 1997.

References

Sources

External links
History of the World Conqueror by Ala Ad Din Ata Malik Juvaini, translated by John Andrew Boyle, Harvard University Press 1958, on the Internet Archive
 

13th-century Iranian historians
1226 births
1283 deaths
Juvayni family
Ilkhanate historians
Officials of the Ilkhanate